María Cristina Narbona Ruiz (born 29 July 1951) is a Spanish politician who currently serves as First Vice President of the Senate. She also presides over the Spanish Socialist Workers' Party (PSOE).
 
From 18 April 2004 to April 2008, she served as Minister of Environment in the government of José Luis Rodríguez Zapatero. She is a trustee of the Fundacion IDEAS, a think tank linked to the PSOE.

Biography
Narbona was born in Madrid. At the age of 12 she emigrated to Rome with her parents, where she obtained a degree in economics before returning to Spain in 1975. Subsequently, she taught at the University of Seville and served in the regional government of Andalucia. In 1993 she joined the Spanish Socialist Workers' Party (PSOE). She served in the local government of Madrid in several capacities. She has represented Madrid in the Spanish Congress since 2000.

On 18 June 2017 she was elected president of Spanish Socialist Worker's Party. Having been in a relationship with fellow PSOE politician Josep Borrell since 1998, they married in July 2018.

She tested positive for the COVID-19 on 1 February 2021 during the pandemic in Spain, but with mild symptoms.

Political views
In a 2002 interview with Telemadrid, Narbona argued that the price of housing in Spain was excessive and out of reach of young people, and called for more government aid in the housing sector.

Narbona is an opponent of nuclear power and supports the gradual closure of nuclear plants in Spain. She has also supported the implementation of the Kyoto Protocols in Spain.

References

External links
Website of the Ministry of Environment of Spain

|-

|-

1951 births
21st-century Spanish women politicians
Environment ministers of Spain
Government ministers of Spain
Living people
Madrid city councillors (1999–2003)
Members of the 7th Congress of Deputies (Spain)
Members of the 8th Congress of Deputies (Spain)
Members of the 9th Congress of Deputies (Spain)
Members of the 13th Senate of Spain
Members of the 14th Senate of Spain
Spanish Socialist Workers' Party politicians
Women government ministers of Spain
20th-century Spanish women